Bolsón may refer to:

Geography:
Bolsón Cove, at the head of Flandres Bay, east of Etienne Fjord, on the west coast of Graham Land
Bolsón de Mapimí, endorheic river basin located in the center-north of the Mexican Plateau
Cerro del Bolsón, mountain in the Aconquija Range of Argentina, in Tucumán province
El Bolsón, Río Negro, town situated in the southwest of Río Negro Province, Argentina
El Bolsón, Catamarca, village and municipality in Catamarca Province in northwestern Argentina

Zoology:
Bolsón night lizard (Xantusia bolsonae), a species of night lizard endemic to the Mexican state of Durango
Bolson pupfish (Cyprinodon atrorus), a species of fish in the family Cyprinodontidae
Bolson tortoise (Gopherus flavomarginatus), a species of tortoise from North America

See also
Bolson
Belson
Bilson
Blouson
Bolozon
Bulson
Polson (disambiguation)